Bassus is a Latin adjective meaning "thick, fat, stumpy, short" and may refer to:

 Bassus (wasp), a genus of braconid wasps

It was also the name of:

Government and military
 Anicius Auchenius Bassus  ( 325 – after 385), Prefect of Rome
 Anicius Auchenius Bassus (consul 408), Roman consul
 Anicius Auchenius Bassus (consul 431), Roman consul
 Gaius Julius Quadratus Bassus (70–117), Roman senator and general
 Gaius Julius Bassus (c. 45 – aft. 101), Roman senator
 Titus Pomponius Bassus, Roman senator
 Gaius Pomponius Bassus Terentianus (fl. 2nd century), Roman military officer and senator
 Pomponius Bassus (consul 211) (175–221), Roman senator and consul
 Pomponius Bassus (consul 259) (220 – after 271), Roman senator and consul
 Junius Bassus ( 318–331), Roman praetorian prefect and consul in 331
 Junius Bassus Theotecnius (317–359), Roman politician
 Lucilius Bassus, Roman legatus appointed by Emperor Vespasian 
 Lucius Caesonius Ovinius Rufinus Manilius Bassus (or Rufinius) (c. 227 – c. 300), Roman consul in 260 and 284
 Caesonius Bassus, Roman consul in 317
 Lucius Valerius Septimius Bassus (c. 328 – after 379), Praefectus Urbi Romae
 Publius Ventidius Bassus, Roman general 
 Septimius Bassus (c. 270 – aft. 319), Roman politician

Others
 Aufidius Bassus, Roman historian
 Caesius Bassus (died 79),  Roman lyric poet
 Cassianus Bassus ( late 6th/early 7th century), called Scholasticus, one of the geoponici
 Saleius Bassus, Roman epic poet
 Saint Bassus of Nice (died c. 248–251), bishop of Nice, martyred under Decius

See also
 Basilica of Junius Bassus, a civil basilica on the Esquiline Hill in Rome
 Sarcophagus of Junius Bassus, early Christian Sarcophagus used by Junius Bassus